Amina Mohammed Baloni is the commissioner of health for Kaduna State. She was appointed by Mallam Nasir Ahmad el-Rufai.

Early life and education 
Aisha Baloni attended Kaduna Capital School, Queen's College Lagos and Ahmadu Bello University Teaching Hospital, Kaduna where she trained as a medical doctor. She obtained certificates from several educational institutes and attended courses in health and development.

Career 
During the COVID-19 pandemic, Baloni urged every citizen of Kaduna State who contracted COVID-19 to submit themselves to an isolation centre for medical treatment. Baloni reported on new cases within the state. Before the lockdown of Kaduna State, only 316 people were positive, but the figures rapidly increased to 1,611. She said "Before now, only seven out of the 23 local government areas had cases of infection but COVID-19 is in 17 local governments".

See also 
 Ministries of Kaduna State

References

External links 
 

People from Kaduna State
Living people
Nigerian women in politics
Yoruba people
Year of birth missing (living people)